The Infant Jesus of Mechelen is an unadorned 16th-century wooden image depicting the Child Jesus holding a globus cruciger and imparting a blessing. It is now in the Louvre Museum in Paris, as a typical representative of a type of image produced in considerable numbers in 
16th-century Mechelen (Malines, in modern Belgium) and exported all over the Catholic world.

Among Santero collectors, the image is often referred to the "fraternal twin" of the Santo Niño de Cebú, with which it shares crucial similarities on posture, gesture, facial expression, and measurement. In September 2009, the image was privately acquired and now housed in the Louvre Museum under security glass. It is displayed naked without any regalia, accessories or vestments formerly associated with other Child Jesus icons.

Background
In the mid-fifteenth century, workshops in Mechelen (Malines, in modern Belgium) began producing small statuettes of male and female saints, and of the infant Jesus, nude and standing on a socle. The dolls are almost always of walnut, preferably carved from a single block of wood. The guild in Mechelen collaborated with workshops in Brussels, and a client could order a Malines doll with the distinctive polychromy from either. 

These (Poupées de Malines) often were part of an altarpiece or an "Enclosed Garden",  ("retables, sometimes with painted side panels, the central section filled not only with narrative sculpture, but also with all sorts of trinkets and hand-worked textiles.") 

Used for private devotion, "Maline dolls" were primarily found in private chapels and beguinages. The Infant Jesus proved particularly popular with convents in the region. Produced in large quantities, they were relatively inexpensive, and became a popular item of export to Spain and Portugal. By the first quarter of the sixteenth century the dolls were ubiquitous throughout Europe.

Description
The image depicts Jesus Christ in his infancy stage. The polychrome materials and characteristics are distinctly from Mechelen, a former part of the Southern Netherlands dating from the early 1500s. The child image alone is made of walnut, carved in a single piece of wood. The present image comprises the following details:

 A cross presumably attached to the Globus Cruciger is missing, and is replaced with a modern finial.
 The uncircumcised phallus of the image is mutilated, unrestored.
 The right forearm of the image is cracked and broken, but was re-attached.
 The feet of the child are attached to its hexagonal peana or red lacquered base using two metal rods (similar to Napolitan Jesus images).
 The frontal hexagonal base made of oak wood is adorned with floral and bead carvings.
 The facial resemblance of the image is playfully frolic, with a pinched mouth and pinkish cheekbones.
 The image follows the "Salvator Mundi" style of Christological depiction.
 The curled hair is gilded with pure gold leaf. No evidence of hair wig in place.

Evidence of European colonial characteristics are present on the statue, such as the gilding of the hair using gold leaf while lead paint and oily potassium is used to the skin, similar to the Encarnacion style of sculpting and painting. Further microscopic examination shows that the image was carved in Mechelen, but was probably painted in Brussels then taken to be distributed in the colonized territories of Spain.

Comparison with the Niño de Cebú image
Both the Mechelen statues and the Santo Niño de Cebú are approximately the same height at approximately 30 cm (12 inches) tall, while having similar characteristics such as the standing pose, naked body, hand blessing gesture and golden globes. Assuming that the camera shots are frontally accurate, the faces are almost exactly similar to one another with the following exceptions:

In published photographs, the Mechelen statue looks frontal and towards in a direct line, while the Cebu statue looks in a downward direction to the devotee although this is relative to the angle of the camera when the picture was taken.

 The Cebu statue's fingers lean to the left, while that of the Mechelen statue points to the right. The original wooden fingers however point upwards when the golden glove is removed. It is possible though that the original wooden arm of the Cebu statue was broken and improperly attached due to the presence of a metallic brace wrapping the wooden arm when the vestments and the golden glove are removed.

 The Mechelen statue's hair is sculpted all the way to the knape or close to the neckline, while the Cebu statue looks like it is only up to the earlobes. In recent photos though, the Cebu statue's hair is sculpted all the way to the nape similar to the Mechelen statue.

Acquisition by the Louvre Museum
The history of acquisition and ownership is unknown and unpublished by the Louvre or Parisian authorities. The image was acquired from a private collector in September 2009 by the Louvre Endowment Fund. It underwent polychrome study, xylology inspection, and radiography to confirm its age and colonial style of authenticity. The image is housed in the Louvre Museum under the Department of Sculptures.

Several pious American Traditionalist Catholics from Texas and New York petitioned the Louvre Endowment fund to purchase and release the custody of the image in 2012 but this petition was not granted. The French magazine La Tribune de l'art featured the image on 16 June 2010 as part of recent Medieval acquisitions by the Louvre Museum.

See also
 Child Jesus
 Santo Niño de Cebú
 Infant Jesus of Prague
 List of Images with Canonical Coronation
 List of statues of Jesus

References

Statues of the infant Jesus
Sculptures of the Louvre by Flemish, Dutch and German artists